The Main Building (known colloquially as The Tower) is a structure at the center of the University of Texas at Austin campus in Downtown Austin, Texas, United States. The Main Building's  tower has 27 floors and is one of the most recognizable symbols of the university and the city.

History

1882–1934 

The old Victorian-Gothic Main Building served as the central point of the campus's forty-acre site, and was used for nearly all purposes beginning in 1882. However, by the 1930s, discussions arose about the need for new library space, and the Main Building was razed in 1934 over the objections of many students and faculty. All that remains of the Old Main Building are its old chime bells (called the Burleson Bells), which are now exhibited as part of a permanent display outside the university's Bass Concert Hall. The modern-day Main Building and Tower were constructed in its place.

1935–present 

Originally, the university planned to use the Tower as a library space, using a dumbwaiter system to carry books from the upper floors to the students requesting them in the circulation room on a lower floor. Library employees were stationed on every other floor; students filled out paper book-request slips, which were sent upstairs by a pneumatic tube. The books were sent down to the students using an 18-story dumbwaiter. This proved ineffective, and the dumbwaiter is no longer used for that purpose. The building now mainly contains administrative offices, though it does still house a three-floor life sciences library and the Miriam Lutcher Stark Library of early and significant editions of English Romanticist works. Two separate sets of elevators serve the building; one in the front, one in back. In the floors above the stacks and below a few top-floor offices, several floors contain the university herbarium (Plant Resources Center). U.S. census data are compiled and analyzed on some of these floors. Lastly, two secure elevators provide access to all 27 floors of the Tower while an elevator on the 27th floor provides access to the 28th-floor Observation Deck. There is also a book elevator in the stacks that serves floors 2 through 17.

The 307-foot (94 m) tower was designed by Paul Philippe Cret. Completed in 1937, the Main Building is located in the middle of campus. At the top of the Tower is a carillon of 56 bells, the largest in Texas. The carillon is played daily.

During World War II, an air raid siren built by the chief communications engineer for the university, Jack Maguire, was placed on top of the Tower to notify Austin residents of incoming air attacks. As there was never an air attack on the city, this siren was only tested and never truly used. The decommissioned siren was superseded by four electronic warning sirens that were installed in early 2007.

1966 massacre 

On August 1, 1966, Charles Joseph Whitman, an architectural engineering student at the university, barricaded himself in the observation deck of the tower of the Main Building with a scoped Remington 700 deer rifle and various other weapons. In a 96-minute standoff, Whitman killed 14 people and wounded 32 more (including 1 who died 35 years later of his wounds). Two police officers and a deputized manager from the co-op from across the mall climbed to the top of the tower and shot Whitman to death.

Suicide site 
Following the Whitman incident, the observation deck was temporarily closed from August 1966 until June 1967  and then closed again in 1974 following nine suicide jumps.

On November 11, 1998, the Board of Regents of the UT system approved the recommendation of Student Association leaders and of then-president Larry Faulkner to reopen the Tower's observation deck to visitors. After the installation of security and safety measures, the observation deck reopened to the public in 1999.

Additionally, the observation deck was closed in 2002 and 2003, due to the September 11 attacks, and was reopened in 2004 with added security.

Tower Girl 
A female peregrine falcon nicknamed Tower Girl first attempted nesting on top of the tower in 2018. The University of Texas Biodiversity Center placed a webcam in order to monitor her, as a successful nesting attempt would expand the documented breeding range of the species in North America.

Lighting 

The Tower usually appears illuminated in white light in the evening, but is lit in various color schemes for special occasions, including athletic victories and academic accomplishments. To mark more somber events, such as the passing of a former president of the university, the Tower remains darkened with a soft grey glow through the night.

Carl J. Eckhardt Jr., head of the Physical Plant in 1931, supervised the construction of the Main Building Tower. Eckhardt devised a lighting system to take advantage of its commanding architecture to announce university achievements. Beginning in 1937, orange lights were used to symbolize important events at the university; by 1947, standard guidelines for using the orange lights were created, and these have been updated since. Today there are many different options for lighting, including a darkened tower to signify solemn occasions. An orange tower with office windows lit to form the numeral "1" is used for national championships in NCAA sporting events.

During Gone To Texas (welcoming new students to campus) and commencement ceremonies, the Tower windows are lit up to form the year (e.g. a 12 for the Class of 2012) of the class being honored.

See also 
 History of the University of Texas at Austin
 List of carillons in the United States

References

External links 

 Official website
 University's collection of news articles concerning the Main Building
 Lighting the Tower, an account of Carl J. Eckhardt Jr.'s work
 Littlefield Fountain, including placement with the Old Main Building
 Photos of Old Main

1937 establishments in Texas
Bell towers in the United States
University and college buildings completed in 1937
Carillons
Clock towers in Texas
Paul Philippe Cret buildings
Skyscraper office buildings in Austin, Texas
Towers completed in 1937
University and college administration buildings in the United States
University of Texas at Austin campus